Sana Safinaz is a Pakistani clothing and accessories retailer based in Karachi, Pakistan.

It sells ready-to-wear, unstitched and haute couture.

It was founded by Sana Hashwani and Safinaz Muneer in Karachi, Pakistan.

History
Sana Safinaz was founded by Sana Hashwani and Safinaz Muneer in 1989 with seed investment of  a few thousand rupees.

In 2014, they celebrated their Silver Jubilee on completion of 25 years of their retailing history. In 2021, "Mahay" collection, broke all records ever made in fashion industry with ever highest sales worldwide. Article 16 A/B and 6A/B became bestsellers.
In an interview with the portal Dawn, Safinaz stated that the influences on the style of clothing is purely cultural.[3] In October 2017, Pakistan was found to be one of the countries whose middle class is on the rise. Being among the eighteen largest countries in the world in terms of middle class, Pakistan's middle class is expected to continue to grow as the population increases. Indifferent to other companies, Sana Safinaz seeks to reach the middle class. By focusing on the middle class, clothes acquire affordable prices and, in this way, the sales contingent is increased. Due to this policy, the company has become one of the largest retailers in Pakistan.

Branches
In Sindh, stores are located in Karachi and Hyderabad. In Punjab, stores are located in Lahore, Islamabad, Rawalpindi, Multan, Sialkot, Gujranwala, Sargodha and Bahawalpur. In Khyber Pakhtunkhwa province, the store is located in Peshawar.

References

External links
 Homepage

Clothing brands of Pakistan
Clothing companies of Pakistan
Companies based in Karachi
Clothing retailers of Pakistan
Clothing companies established in 1989
Retail companies established in 1989
Pakistani companies established in 1989
Pakistani fashion designers